Admete tenuissima is a species of sea snail, a marine gastropod mollusc in the family Cancellariidae, the nutmeg snails.

Description
The length of the shell varies between 16 mm and 20 mm.

Distribution
This marine species occurs off Japan.

References

External links
 Hemmen J. (2007) Recent Cancellariidae. Annotated and illustrated catalogue of Recent Cancellariidae. Privately published, Wiesbaden. 428 pp. [With amendments and corrections taken from Petit R.E. (2012) A critique of, and errata for, Recent Cancellariidae by Jens Hemmen, 2007. Conchologia Ingrata 9: 1–8
 Intergovernmental Oceanographic Commission (IOC) of UNESCO. The Ocean Biogeographic Information System 

Cancellariidae
Gastropods described in 2002